Ellesmere Park High School is a coeducational secondary school located in the Ellesmere Park area of Eccles, Greater Manchester, England.

History

Secondary Modern School
Ellesmere Park High School has undergone several changes over the years. Essentially the school site that we now know as Ellesmere Park High School, on Wentworth Road, was originally built as a secondary modern school in the late 1950s. 

The focus of the secondary modern schools was to provide pupils with a formal Certificate of Secondary Education (CSE). Until this point, children leaving school were offered no formal certifications, other than non-standardised internal examinations. 

The first appointed Headmaster, Mr V. D. Boothman, a former pupil of neighbouring Eccles Grammar School, transferred from his teaching position  at the neighbouring secondary school in Winton, to steer this brand new school into a promising future. This, he did.

Unlike other secondary modern schools of the period, Mr Boothman insisted that his pupils be offered the opportunity to take what were then becoming known as "external examinations" GCE O-levels, the same qualifications offered to the pupils at grammar schools; and separate to those which, at that time, were known as "internal examinations" devised by each school with no parity across the education committee. This coup de gras was achieved by cunning alacrity.

As such, all pupils in the third year were to sit an internal examination called, The Qualifying Exam, and from this they were split into three ability groups: those pupils who were offered the GCE (General Certificate of Education) curriculum in all of their subjects; those pupils who were offered CSE examinations in the core subjects, plus vocational subjects chosen from a choice of three focus groups; plus the option to take a number of these subjects at GCE also. 

The vocational focus groups were: 1) Commercial, 2) Secretarial; and 3) Technical (woodwork, tech drawing, metal work). There was a third group, which focussed on pupils' achievements in the core subjects. Typing was common to both the Commercial and Secretarial classes, whilst Shorthand was the preserve of the Secretarial class. Royal Society of Arts (RSA) examinations were also offered in these subjects.

Until 1971  there was a sixth-form at Ellesmere Park Secondary Modern School, but following the building of Eccles Sixth Form College at the bottom of Chatsworth Road in Ellesmere Park (just down the road from the secondary modern school) the sixth-year pupils would join others from the neighbouring schools: Eccles Grammar, Winton Secondary Modern and Wardley Grammar schools and take their further education tuition, including, A-levels, there. A number of teachers from Eccles and Wardley grammar schools transferred to either Ellesmere Park Secondary Modern School, or the new Eccles Sixth Form College.

In September 1973 Ellesmere Park Secondary Modern School, opened for the first time, as a comprehensive school with a new name: Ellesmere Park High School. For a number of years, this school had two sites: the Monton Building, aka former-Eccles Grammar; and the Eccles Building, aka the current and former Ellesmere Park Secondary Modern School.

Grammar school
The Monton Building, formerly known as Eccles Grammar School was the first secondary school built by Lancashire County Council after the 1902 Education Act. The foundation stone was laid by county education committee chairman, County Ald. Sir Henry Fleming Herbert, in 1910, and the first intake of about 95 pupils, most of whom were over 12, arrived on Sept. 18, 1911. The original building was on Park Road in Monton, at the top of Hawthorn Avenue. 

This building was still used during the 1980s for 1st and 2nd year secondary pupils and was then pulled down to make way for housing. 

The building on Wentworth Road housed the 3rd, 4th and 5th years pupils, till the closing of the Monton building. The grammar school's magazine was called the Essayon.

Comprehensive
The comprehensive school started out as a split-site school with these two sites: the old grammar school site and the former secondary modern site. It is the secondary modern site that was further developed.
 
As stated, the Eccles Building, the former Ellesmere Park Secondary Modern School became a comprehensive school in 1973 known as Ellesmere Park High School on Wentworth Road. The school became Wentworth High School in 1987 and was extended in 1990.

The school was renamed Ellesmere Park High School in September 2014 and moved to a new, more modern building.

Academy
Previously a community school administered by Salford City Council, in July 2017 Ellesmere Park High School converted to academy status. The school is now sponsored by Consilium Academies.

Notable former pupils

Wentworth High School
 Linzey Cocker, actress
 Joe Duddell, composer

Ellesmere Park High School (1973–87)
 Andy Crane, TV and radio presenter, does the weekday afternoon slot on BBC Radio Manchester

Eccles Grammar School
 Sidney Clarke (priest), Chaplain-in-Chief from 1930-33 of the RAF
 Bryce Fulton, full back for Plymouth Argyle F.C.
 Nicholas Higham FRS, mathematician
 Debbie Horsfield, TV writer who wrote Making Out, and the adaptation for the Poldark (2015 TV series)
 Elgar Howarth, brass band conductor
 Tom Neil DFC (1920-2018), Battle of Britain pilot
 Tony Warren MBE, creator of Coronation Street

See also
 Worsley Wardley Grammar School

References

External links 
 
 Former school

Secondary schools in Salford
Academies in Salford
Eccles, Greater Manchester